Leonard Reginald 'Len' Brennan (1911-1943) was an Australian rugby league footballer who played in the 1930s. He was a casualty of World War II.

Career

Len Brennan was a local from Ramsgate, New South Wales, and played three seasons of first grade with the St George Dragons between 1932-1934, including the 1933 Grand Final. Len also played with his oldest brother Joe Brennan at  St. George during his career. They were both wingers.

War death

Brennan enlisted in the RAAF during 1941 and became a Flight Sergeant in 104 Squadron. On 8 June 1943, Brennan served as the co-pilot of a Vickers Wellington bomber sent on an operational flight. During the flight, the bomber was shot down, and all aboard save one were killed. An account of the day was written by the survivor, the pilot, Pilot Officer F.E. McLaren.

McLaren was picked up by Royal Navy ships at about 2:00 pm the next day, but nobody else survived.

References

St. George Dragons players
Australian rugby league players
1911 births
1943 deaths
Royal Australian Air Force personnel of World War II
Australian military personnel killed in World War II
Rugby league wingers
Rugby league players from Sydney